A Yūpa (यूप), or Yūpastambha, was a Vedic sacrificial pillar used in Ancient India. It is one of the most important elements of the Vedic ritual.

The execution of a victim (generally an animal), who was tied at the Yūpa, was meant to bring prosperity to everyone.

Isapur Yūpa
The Isapur Yūpa, now in the Mathura Museum, was found at Isapur in the vicinity of Mathura, and has an inscription in the name of the third century CE Kushan ruler Vāsishka, and mentions the erection of the Yūpa pillar for a sacrificial session.

Yūpa in coinage
During the Gupta Empire period, the Ashvamedha scene of a horse tied to a yūpa sacrificial post appears on the coinage of Samudragupta. On the reverse, the queen is holding a chowrie for the fanning of the horse and a needle-like pointed instrument, with legend "One powerful enough to perform the Ashvamedha sacrifice".

Yūpa inscription in Indonesia

The oldest known Sanskrit inscriptions in the Nusantara are those on seven stone pillars,or Yūpa ("sacrificial posts"), found in the eastern part of Borneo, in the historical area of Kutai, East Kalimantan province. They were written by Brahmins using the early Pallava script, in the Sanskrit language, to commemorate sacrifices held by a generous mighty king called Mulavarman who ruled the Kutai Martadipura Kingdom, the first Hindu kingdom in present Indonesia. Based on palaeographical grounds, they have been dated to the second half of the 4th century CE. They attest to the emergence of an Indianized state in the Indonesian archipelago prior to 400 CE.

In addition to Mulavarman, the reigning king, the inscriptions mention the names of his father Aswawarman and his grandfather Kudungga (the founder of the Kutai Martadipura Kingdom). Aswawarman is the first of the line to bear a Sanskrit name in the Yupa which indicates that he was probably the first to adhere to Hinduism.

Text
The four Yupa inscriptions founded are classified as "Muarakaman"s and has been translated by language experts as follows:  

Muarakaman I

srimatah sri-narendrasya,
kundungasya mahatmanah,
putro svavarmmo vikhyatah,
vansakartta yathansuman,
tasya putra mahatmanah,
trayas traya ivagnayah,
tesan trayanam pravarah,
tapo-bala-damanvitah,
sri mulawarmma rajendro,
yastva bahusuvarnnakam,
tasya yajnasya yupo 'yam,
dvijendrais samprakalpitah.

Muarakaman II

srimad-viraja-kirtteh
rajnah sri-mulavarmmanah punyam
srnvantu vipramukhyah
ye canye sadhavah purusah
bahudana-jivadanam
sakalpavrksam sabhumidanan ca
tesam punyagananam
yupo 'yan stahapito vipraih

Muarakaman III

sri-mulavarmmano rajnah
yad dattan tilla-parvvatam
sadipa-malaya sarddham
yupo 'yam likhitas tayoh

Muarakaman IV

srimato nrpamukhyasya
rajnah sri-mulawarmmanah
danam punyatame ksetre
yad dattam vaprakesvare
dvijatibhyo' gnikalpebhyah.
vinsatir ggosahasrikam
tansya punyasya yupo 'yam
krto viprair ihagataih.

Translation
Translation according to the Indonesia University of Education:

Muarakaman I
The Maharaja Kudungga, who was very noble, had a famous son, the Aswawarman his name, who like the Ansuman (the sun god) grew a very noble family. The Aswawarman had three sons, like three (holy) fire. The foremost of the three sons was the Mulavarman, a king who was civilized, strong and powerful. The Mulavarman has held a feast (salvation called) a lot of gold. For commemoration of the feast (salvation) that this stone monument was erected by the brahmins.

Muarakaman II
Listen to all of you, eminent Brahmins, and all other good people, about the virtues of the Mulavarman, the great king who is very noble. This kindness is in the form of a lot of alms, as if the alms of life or just a kalpa tree (which gives all desires), with land alms (which is given). It is with this goodness that this monument was erected by the Brahmins (for a memorial).

Muarakaman III
This monument was written for (commemorating) two (cases) that have been donated by King Mulavarman, namely a mountain of oil (thick), with lamps and flower panicles.

Muarakaman IV
The Mulavarman, the noble and eminent king, has given alms of 20,000 cows to the brahmins who is like fire, (located) in the holy land (named) Waprakeswara. For (remembrance) of the kindness of the king, this monument has been made by the Brahmins who came to this place.

The Yupas are now kept in the National Museum of Indonesia in Jakarta.

References

Mathura art
Vedic animal sacrifice